This list includes notable psychologists and contributors to psychology, some of whom may not have thought of themselves primarily as psychologists but are included here because of their important contributions to the discipline.

Specialized lists of psychologists can be found at the articles on comparative psychology, list of clinical psychologists, list of developmental psychologists, list of educational psychologists, list of evolutionary psychologists, list of social psychologists, and list of cognitive scientists.  Many psychologists included in those lists are also listed below:



A 

 Alfred Adler (Founder of the school of individual psychology)
 Mary Ainsworth
 Estefania Aldaba-Lim
 George Albee
 Joseph P. Allen
 Jüri Allik
 Lauren Alloy
 Gordon Allport, personality psychology
 Adelbert Ames, Jr.
 Marie Anaut
 Harlene Anderson
 John R. Anderson
 Ernst Angel
 Heinz Ansbacher
 Edgar Anstey
 Michael Apter, reversal theory
 Michael Argyle, social psychology, discourse analysis
 Robert Arkin, social psychology
 Magda B. Arnold
 Solomon Asch (Asch conformity experiments, Social influence, Peer pressure)
 Roberto Assagioli
 John William Atkinson, human motivation, achievement and behavior
 Aušra Augustinavičiūtė
 Averroes (Ibn Rushd)
 Virginia Axline, play therapy

B 

 Arthur J. Bachrach, underwater and extreme environments
 Alan Baddeley, three-component model of working memory
 Renee Baillargeon
 Ahmed ibn Sahl al-Balkhi
 Albert Bandura, social learning theory
 Aron K. Barbey
 Russell Barkley
 Jerome Barkow
 Dermot Barnes-Holmes
 Simon Baron-Cohen
 Deirdre Barrett, dreams and hypnosis
 Lisa Feldman Barrett
 Lawrence W. Barsalou
 Frederic Bartlett, memory schema
 Daniel Batson
 Diana Baumrind
 Nancy Bayley
 Geoffrey Beattie, body language, psychology in sustainable consumption
 Sandra Bem
 Erich Benjamin
 Gershon Ben-Shakhar
 Hubert Benoit
 Richard Bentall
 Larry E. Beutler, systematic treatment selection
 Alfred Binet (Intelligence testing, first practical IQ test, the Binet–Simon test)
 Robert A. Bjork
 Randolph Blake, binocular rivalry
 Ray Blanchard, sexology
 Theodore H. Blau, first practising clinician elected President of the APA
 Stephen F. Blinkhorn
 Paul Bloom
 Barbara Bonner
 Edmund Bourne
 Gordon H. Bower
 John Bowlby, attachment theory
 Nathaniel Branden, self-esteem, objectivism
 Franz Brentano
 Shlomo Breznitz 
 Carl Brigham
 Donald Broadbent, cognitive psychology
 Urie Bronfenbrenner, ecological systems theory
 Kelly Brownell
 Jerome Bruner, child development
 Emily Bushnell
 David Buss
 Brian Butterworth
 Ruth M. J. Byrne

C 

 Mary Whiton Calkins
 Donald T. Campbell
 Susan Carey
 James Cattell, helped establish psychology as a legitimate science
 Raymond Cattell, factor analysis, 16PF Questionnaire and the Big Five, fluid versus crystallized intelligence
 Stephen J. Ceci, intelligence and memory
 Jean-Martin Charcot
 Nancy Chodorow
 Noam Chomsky, Linguistics, Cognitive Science
 Robert Cialdini
 Kenneth B. Clark
 Mamie Phipps Clark
 Lee Anna Clark
 Asher Cohen
 Clyde Coombs
 Cary Cooper
 Suzanne Corkin
 Leda Cosmides
 Lee Chambers (psychologist)
 Catharine Cox, intelligence, genius
 Lee Cronbach, testing and measurement
 Mihaly Csikszentmihalyi, Positive psychology, Happiness & Creativity

D 

 Martin Daly
 Martin Dannecker
 John Darley
 Daniel O David
 Raymond Dean, neuropsychology
 Randy Dellosa
 Florence Denmark
 Helene Deutsch
 John Dewey, (Functional psychology)
 Ed Diener, (Happiness)
 Dietrich Doerner
 Robin Dunbar
 David F. Duncan

E 

 Hermann Ebbinghaus, experimental study of memory 
 Jennifer Eberhardt, racial bias in criminal justice
 Paul Ekman, (emotions and facial expressions)
 Albert Ellis, (Founder of rational emotive behavior therapy, Founder of cognitive-behavioral therapies)
 Hadyn Ellis
 Virgilio Enriquez, founder of Filipino psychology
 Erik H. Erikson, (Erikson's stages of psychosocial development)
 Milton H. Erickson
 John E. Exner, developed the comprehensive system for administering, coding, and interpreting the Rorschach test
 Hans Eysenck

F 

 Norman Farberow
 Gustav Fechner, founder of psychophysics
 Leon Festinger, cognitive dissonance
 Cordelia Fine
 Susan Fiske
 Edna B. Foa
Donata Francescato
 Viktor Frankl, founder of logotherapy
 Marie-Louise von Franz
 Barbara Fredrickson
 Armindo Freitas-Magalhães
 Anna Freud
 Sigmund Freud, (Founder of psychoanalysis)
 Erich Fromm, (psychoanalyst)
 Adrian Furnham

G 

 John Gabrieli
 Gordon G. Gallup, Jr., mirror self-recognition (MSR) test
 Francis Galton, (His book Hereditary Genius was the first social scientific attempt to study genius and greatness)
 Laszlo Garai
 Riley Gardner
 Elmer R. Gates
 Susan Gathercole
 Isabel Gauthier, perceptual expertise, object and face recognition
 Bertram Gawronski
 Kenneth Gergen, social constructionism
 Hans-Werner Gessmann, humanistic psychodrama
 Eleanor J. Gibson
 J. J. Gibson
 Gerd Gigerenzer, bounded rationality
Daniel Gilbert, (Social psychology, Affective forecasting)
 Gustave Gilbert
 Carol Gilligan
 Fernand Gobet, cognitive psychology
 Stan Gooch
 Christian Gostečnik, clinical psychology and marriage-and-family therapist
 Irving I. Gottesman, behavioral genetics
 Clare W. Graves, (emergent cyclical levels of existence theory)
 Richard Green, sexology
 Florence Goodenough
 John Gottman, marital stability and relationships
 Elizabeth Gould
 James Greeno, experimental psychology and learning science
 James Gross
 Robert Grosseteste
 Félix Guattari, founder of schizoanalysis
 Germaine Guex
 J. P. Guilford
 Edwin Ray Guthrie

H 

 Jonathan Haidt, (psychology of morality)
 Jay Haley
 G. Stanley Hall
 Tsuruko Haraguchi
 Robert D. Hare
 Harry Harlow
 Chris Hatcher
 Steven C. Hayes
 Donald O. Hebb
 Fritz Heider
 Asgeir Helgason
 Hermann von Helmholtz
 Hubert Hermans
 Richard Herrnstein
 Gerard Heymans
 Felicitas Heyne
 William Edmund Hick
 James Hillman
 Leta Stetter Hollingworth
 James Hollis
 Margie Holmes
 Edwin Holt
 Keith Holyoak
 Bruce Hood, developmental cognitive neuroscience
 Karen Horney (Ten Neurotic Needs)
 Ruth Winifred Howard
 Ethel Dench Puffer Howes
 Clark L. Hull
 Nicholas Humphrey
 Edwin Hutchins

I 
 Bärbel Inhelder

J 

William James, (James–Lange theory of emotion, psychology of religion)
 Marie Jahoda
 Kay Redfield Jamison, clinical psychology, bipolar disorder
 Joseph Jastrow
 Julian Jaynes
 Arthur Jensen, (Heritability of IQ, Race and intelligence, g factor)
 Jaqueline Jesus
 Marcia K. Johnson
 Mark H. Johnson
 Philip Johnson-Laird, cognition, psychology of reasoning
 Ernest Jones
 Mary Cover Jones
 Carl Jung, (Analytical psychology)
 J. P. Das, (PASS Theory)

K 

 Jerome Kagan
 Daniel Kahneman, (Nobel Prize in Economics, behavioral finance and hedonic psychology)
 Mieko Kamiya
 Jacob Robert Kantor, organized scientific values into a coherent system of psychology
 Nancy Kanwisher
 Rachel and Stephen Kaplan, (Environmental psychology)
 Leonard Katz
 Alan S. Kaufman
 Nadeen L. Kaufman
 Alan Kazdin
 David Keirsey
 George Kelly
 Harold Kelley
 Isabelle Kendig
 Otto F. Kernberg
 Antoni Kępiński
 Doreen Kimura, sex and cognition
 Akiyoshi Kitaoka
Gary Klein, (pioneer in the field of naturalistic decision making)
 Melanie Klein
 Michael D. Knox antiwar activism
 Brian Knutson
 Kurt Koffka, (co-founder of Gestalt psychology)
 Wolfgang Köhler, (co-founder of Gestalt psychology)
 Lawrence Kohlberg, moral psychology
 Heinz Kohut
 Arthur Kornhauser, industrial psychologist
 Stephen Kosslyn
 Elizabeth Kübler-Ross
 Fritz Künkel, we-psychology

L 

 Jacques Lacan (psychoanalyst)
 George Trumbull Ladd
 Christine Ladd-Franklin
 Ellen Langer
 Jan van der Lans
 Karl Lashley
 Bibb Latane
 Richard Lazarus
 John Francis Leader
 Timothy Leary
 Averil Leimon
 Patrick Leman
 Mark Lepper
 Jerre Levy, lateralization of brain function
 Kurt Lewin, social psychology
 David Lewis
 Rensis Likert, Likert Scale
 Marsha M. Linehan
 Elizabeth Loftus, memory
 Konrad Lorenz
 Alexander Luria

M 

 Eleanor Maccoby
 Margaret Mahler, Hungarian, central figure in psychoanalysis
 Ernest "Mark" Mahone
 George Mandler
 Jean Matter Mandler
 James G. March, cognitive organizational psychology
 Abraham Maslow, (Maslow's hierarchy of needs)
 William Masters and Virginia Johnson, (Pioneered research into the nature of Human sexual response, diagnosis, treatment)
 Rollo May
 Rufus May
 Dan P. McAdams
 Francis T. McAndrew
 David McClelland
 James McClelland
 Sally-Anne McCormack
 William McDougall
 Patrick J McGrath
 Phil McGraw
 Peter McGuffin
 David McNeill
 George Herbert Mead
 Paul Meehl
 Jacques Mehler
 Rivka Bertisch Meir
 Andrew Meltzoff
 Ronald Melzack
 Wolfgang Metzger
 David E. Meyer
 Stanley Milgram, (Milgram experiment)
 Alice Miller
 George A. Miller
 Jacques-Alain Miller
 Neal E. Miller, biofeedback
 William R. Miller, (Motivational interviewing (MI))
 Theodore Millon, personality disorders
 Brenda Milner
 Arnold Mindell, process oriented psychology
 Walter Mischel, (Marshmallow experiment)
 Munesuke Mita
 John Money
 Maria Montessori
 Jacob L. Moreno, psychodrama
 C. Lloyd Morgan, canon
 John Morton
 Yūjirō Motora
 Orval Hobart Mowrer
 Georg Elias Müller
 Henry Murray
 Hugo Münsterberg
 Charles Samuel Myers

N 
 Albert Nalchajyan
 Ulric Neisser
 Erich Neumann
 Richard Nisbett
 Donald Norman
 Kent Norman

O 
 Charles E. Osgood
 Joy Osofsky
 J. Buzz Von Ornsteiner
 Lise Østergaard

P 

 Allan Paivio
 Linda Papadopoulos
 Ivan Pavlov
 Carolyn R. Payton
 Fritz Perls
 Cheves Perky (Perky Effect)
 Christopher Peterson
 Anne C. Petersen
 Eva Bendix Petersen
 Jordan Peterson
 Jean Piaget, (Piagetian psychology and genetic epistemology, Piaget's theory of cognitive development)
 Robert O. Pihl
 Steven Pinker, (experimental psychology, cognitive science)
 Robert Plomin
 Michael Posner
 Jonathan Potter
 James W. Prescott
 LeShawndra Price
 Inez Beverly Prosser
 Lorine Livingston Pruette
 Zenon Pylyshyn, cognitive psychology

R 

 Otto Rank, (psychoanalyst)
 Rosalie Rayner
 Reimut Reiche
 Dennis Reina
 Ulf-Dietrich Reips
 Daniel Reisberg
 Robert Remez
 Samuel Renshaw
 Cecil R. Reynolds
 Judith Rich Harris
 Sylvia Rimm
 Michele Ritterman
 Carl Rogers, (Person-centered therapy)
 Eleanor Rosch
 Paul Rosenfels
 Robert Rosenthal
 Barbara Rothbaum, virtual reality therapy
 John Rowan
 Philip Rubin
 Susanna Rubinstein
 David Rumelhart
 Michelle K. Ryan

S 

 Jeanne Safer, psychotherapy
 Eleanor Saffran
 Tamaki Saitō
 Virginia Satir
 Shlomo Sawilowsky, psychometrics, construct validity for the multitrait-multimethod matrix
 Daniel Schacter
 Stanley Schachter, affiliation studies, two factor theory of emotion
 Roy Schafer
 K. Warner Schaie
 Edgar Schein
 Gunter Schmidt
 Kirk Schneider, existential-integrative therapy
 Erich Schröger
 Walter Dill Scott
 Martin Seligman, (Founder of positive psychology, happiness, learned helplessness)
 Deborah Serani
 Francine Shapiro, (Founder of EMDR)
 Tamara Sher
 Sara Shettleworth
 Hunter B. Shirley
 Morita Shoma
 Volkmar Sigusch
 Herbert A. Simon, Nobel Prize in Economics
 Théodore Simon, French psychologist who developed the Binet-Simon scale
 Amy Singer
 B. F. Skinner, (Founder of radical behaviorism)
 Victor Skumin
 Paul Slovic
 Stanley Smith Stevens
 Charles Spearman
 Elizabeth Spelke
 Janet Taylor Spence
 Herbert Spencer
 Sabina Spielrein
 Clara Stern
 Robert Sternberg
 Saul Sternberg
 Paul Stevenson
 Fritz Strack
 George M. Stratton, founder of UC Berkeley's department of psychology
 Harry Stack Sullivan
 Carl Stumpf
 William Swann
 Norbert Schwarz
 José Szapocznik
 Timea Szentkiraly-Boda

T 

 Ali ibn Sahl Rabban al-Tabari
 Henri Tajfel, prejudice, social identity
 Jeffrey S. Tanaka
 Shelley E. Taylor
 Lewis Terman, (IQ, Genius, Talent)
 Philip E. Tetlock (The Good Judgment Project, Forecasting, Decision making)
 Sharon Thompson-Schill
 Edward Thorndike, puzzle boxes, connectionism
 L. L. Thurstone, pioneer in psychometrics and psychophysics
 Edward Titchener
 Edward C. Tolman
 John Tooby
 Ellis Paul Torrance
 Anne Treisman, Feature integration theory, Attenuation theory, object perception, memory
 Reiko True
 Jeanne Tsai
 Endel Tulving
 Elliot Turiel, founder of domain theory (primary challenge to Kohlberg's stages of moral development)
 John Turner, collaborated with Tajfel on social identity theory and later developed self-categorization theory
 Amos Tversky
 David Tzuriel

U 
 Dimitri Uznadze

V 
 Douglas Vakoch
 Alfons Vansteenwegen
 Magdalen Dorothea Vernon
 Vaira Vīķe-Freiberga
 Hedwig von Restorff
 Lev Vygotsky, (cultural-historical psychology)
 Stuart Vyse

W 

 Joan Scott Wallace, outside of government service, a psychologist and educator
 Henri Wallon, French psychology
 Hans-Jürgen Walter, (Founder of Gestalt theoretical psychotherapy)
 Margaret Floy Washburn, first female psychology PhD
 John B. Watson, Watsonian behaviorism
 Paul Watzlawick
 Ernst Heinrich Weber
 David Wechsler
 Nicole Weekes, psychologist and neuroscientist
 Karl E. Weick, cognitive organizational psychology
 Robert Weimar
 Max Wertheimer, co-founder of Gestalt psychology
 Drew Westen
 Michael White, (Founder of narrative therapy)
 Ken Wilber, transpersonal psychology, then integral psychology
 Glenn D. Wilson, personality and sexual behaviour
 Richard Wiseman
 Władysław Witwicki, one of the fathers of psychology in Poland, the creator of the theory of cratism
 Gustav Adolf Wohlgemuth
 Donald Woods Winnicott
 Robert S. Woodworth
 Helen Thompson Woolley
 Wilhelm Wundt, (One of the founders of modern psychology as a discipline, father of experimental psychology)
 Karen Wynn

X 
 Fei Xu, Developmental Psychology and Cognitive Science

Y 

 Rivka Yahav, psychotherapist
 Irvin D. Yalom, (Existential psychiatrist)
 Robert Yerkes

Z 
 Robert J. Zajonc
 Oliver Zangwill
 René Zazzo
 Bluma Zeigarnik, (Zeigarnik effect)
 Philip Zimbardo
 Kenneth Zucker

See also
 List of clinical psychologists
 List of cognitive psychologists
 List of cognitive scientists
 List of developmental psychologists
 List of educational psychologists
 List of psychiatrists
 List of social psychologists

External links 
Eminent psychologists of the 20th century

Psychologists
Psychologists
Psychologists
 
Psychologists